Elias rekefisker (Elias the Shrimp Fisher) is a 1958 Norwegian family film directed by Jan Erik Düring, starring Kristian Løvlie and Eva Svendsen. A family on an island in Southern Norway rescues a carrier pigeon. When the father and son later are lost at sea, the bird comes in handy.

References

External links
 
 

1958 films
Norwegian children's films
Films directed by Jan Erik Düring